Eugenia Rusin (20 March 1933 – 15 October 1995) was a Polish athlete. She competed in the women's shot put at the 1960 Summer Olympics.

References

External links
 

1933 births
1995 deaths
Athletes (track and field) at the 1960 Summer Olympics
Polish female shot putters
Olympic athletes of Poland
Place of birth missing